The current French railway signalling system is in force on the Réseau Ferré de France (now SNCF Réseau) since 1930, when the code Verlant was applied.

History
Historically, each private railway company designed and used its own signals. However, during the First World War the interpenetration of trains between networks had increased, so that it became necessary to create a new unified signals specification. A commission was set up in May 1926, directed by Eugène Verlant of the PLM.

The Verlant commission submitted its report at the end of 1927. The new code of signals received the approval of the Ministry of Public Labour on 1 August 1930. Conversion to the Verlant code was completed only at the end of 1936, except on the network of Alsace-Lorraine where it was completed later, because of the unusual pre-existing signalling.

The Verlant code was very innovative, based on simple principles:
 Mainly based on color light signalling, which thereafter simplified the installation of the automatic block.
 Light signals used three basic colors: red (stop), yellow (to announce stop or limited speed), green (clear). This color code was already applied by many foreign companies. It was also used for traffic lights.
 Simplification: it presented only the most imperative indications (except in special cases).

Placement of signals
Signals are normally placed on the side of the line: on the left if the trains run on the left. However, in the Départements of Bas-Rhin, Haut-Rhin and Moselle, trains normally run on the right and so signals are placed on the right. This area was part of Germany from 1870 to 1918; trains run on the right in Germany and the railways were built during that period. When the area became French again in 1918, the railway network was almost complete, and trains ran on the right. Reversing the direction would be too expensive, in particular for interlocking, so circulation and signals remained on the right.

In several stations and on several line sections, when the local layout requires it, signals can be set on the right. They are then equipped with a white arrow indicating the way to which they are addressed.

On some double-track line sections equipped with  "permanent counter-track installations" (IPCS), signals are placed normally on the right for counter-track circulations. No white arrows are used. In fact, entering the wrong way is confirmed by a luminous counter-track entrance board (TECS), which, when lit, indicates that the following signals are placed on the right (on the left for Alsace and Moselle). Similarly, a counter-track exit board (TSCS) indicates the return to normal running, with signals placed on the normal side.

Where trains run on the left, the hand-held stop signals (red flag, stop marker or lantern with red light) are presented on the left or at the center of the relevant track. If there is a platform by the track, they can be presented on the side of the platform.

Aspects 
In general, the signalling device comprises:
 a 'go' signal (green), meaning that the next block is free, allowing normal operation
 Warning signals or speed limits (yellow) requiring the driver to slow the train and especially to be able to stop before the next stop signal;
 Stop signals (red) requires the train to stop.

These signals are supplemented by "indicator signals" showing speed limits, slow-down orders and reminders to go slow on a diverging route, various indications about the track layout (number, dead ends or garage) the signs of electrical section, numbers of radio channels.

If the distance between the stop signal and a distant signal is too short (it can sometimes get down to 400 m), then the previous distant signal has a yellow flashing to inform the driver of the short distance between the two following signals.

Mobile and temporary signals  (e.g. construction), are used to  complement permanent fixed signals.

Some signals are specific to manoeuvres.

These include various types of signals:
 Hand signals,
 Mechanical signals,
 Lights,
 Acoustic signals
 Signal board.

Respect of signals is an imperative condition sine qua non of safety. The first section of the safety regulations of the SNCF indicates that "any official, whatever his rank must obey passively and immediately any signals that are presented."

Block systems 

The block system is based on breaking a line into block sections. The block sections on a line between two stations are part of the block system.

Non interlocked manual blocks:  For safety reasons, non-interlocked manual blocks are used only on double track.

Interlocked manual blocks:  In the case of a single track, interlocking is used in manual blocks to avoid an error resulting in a head-on collision.

Automatic blocks:  Two types of automatic block are in common use in France.  BAL (Bloc Automatique Lumineux) is used on high traffic lines with block lengths of about 1500 m) and BAPR  (Bloc automatique à permissivité restreinte) is used in low traffic areas with block lengths up to 15 km.

Normally a train can only enter a block if it is free. The block is a track section delimited by signals, whose length depends on the distance needed for a train to stop or slow down, in the worst conditions on the portion of line under consideration. When traffic density is low, the blocks may be longer.

In future, the blocks may be mobile and follow the progress of the train (virtual blocks, not materialized on the ground and calculated continuously by an integrated onboard system). This will optimize the use of the line and reduce the distance needed between successive trains. This moving block system is already in use on the central section of the RER line A between Nanterre-Préfecture and Vincennes. The trackside signals are still in place but are turned off at the approach of a train whose mobile system signalling (SACEM) is confirmed in operation. They are turned on if problems arise.

The current signalling system has already reduced the spacing between trains from 3 to 2 min. But this is still too long on the busiest lines (suburban, and high-speed lines). In comparison, the moving blocks of the RER A allow a separation of only 90 seconds between trains at full speed.

Wayside signals 

Here are some examples of signals used on the French network.

Signals and signs give information and special instructions to train drivers. For simplicity, only the most common elements are presented here.

Stop signals and warning signals

Speed limits

Shunting

Stopping points in stations

Indications for electric locomotives

Other signs

Cab signalling 

With the arrival of the TGV, and its operating speeds well over 200 km/h, trackside signalling had to be abandoned in favour of cab-signalling, using track to cab communication technology known as Transmission Voie-Machine (TVM).

ETCS 

This system is intended to replace the different national signalling systems.

Bibliography

External links
 French signalling
 French signalling section of The Signal Page
 The European Railway Signalling Server
 History of French signals
 Principles and description of SNCF signalling (in french)
 Speed control by beacons and SNCF in-cab signal repeaters (in french)
 SNCF signalling (in french)
 Biography of Eugène Verlant, history of code Verlant

France